Jeannette Sorrell is an American conductor and harpsichordist and the founder and musical director of Apollo's Fire, the Cleveland Baroque Orchestra.

Biography

Youth
Jeannette Sorrell was born in San Francisco in 1965. Her father, a European immigrant, was a drama critic and linguist. Her mother, an American, was a nurse. Both parents became university professors by the time Jeannette Sorrell was 8 years old. She grew up studying piano, violin, ballet and theatre. In an interview with the Cleveland Plain Dealer, she describes how she spent her first year of piano lessons (at the age of 9) practicing on a paper keyboard that she made, because the family had no piano. Her family moved to the Shenandoah Valley area of Virginia when she was 14.  She took her first paid job at the age of 15, playing the piano for a Southern Baptist church.  This is where she first encountered early American folk music and shape-note hymns, which later developed into an artistic interest for her.  At 16 she began studying conducting and composition, and founded an instrumental and vocal ensemble for which she arranged all of the music.

Studies: 1988-1991 
Sorrell received a full scholarship to the Artist Diploma program of Oberlin Conservatory, where she studied harpsichord with Lisa Crawford and orchestral conducting with Robert Spano.  In 1989 she became one of the youngest students in the conducting program at the Tanglewood Festival, where she studied under Leonard Bernstein and Sir Roger Norrington.  Upon graduating from Oberlin in 1990, she was immediately invited to join the faculty of Oberlin's summer baroque institute as chamber music coach and continuo accompanist.  That summer she also served as a conducting fellow at the Aspen Music Festival.

She then moved to Amsterdam to study harpsichord with Gustav Leonhardt.  Following this year of intensive study with Leonhardt, she won First Prize and the Audience Choice Award in the 1991 Spivey International Harpsichord Competition held in Atlanta, GA, competing in a field of 70 contestants from Europe, the former Soviet Union, Israel and the U.S.

Founding of Apollo's Fire
In 1991, Sorrell returned to the U.S. and was immediately invited to interview for the position of Assistant Conductor with The Cleveland Orchestra. She had not applied for the post but had been recommended by Affiliate Artists, whose agent had seen her conducting at Aspen and Tanglewood. In various interviews, Sorrell has recounted her meeting with Cleveland Orchestra Music Director Christoph von Dohnanyi, who told her that there was no point in trying to find time in the orchestra's schedule for an audition because the audience in Cleveland would never accept a woman as a conductor.  Sorrell replied that she had actually not sought this post and she really wanted to work with period instruments.  Following this interview, the orchestra's artistic administrator Roger Wright offered to help Sorrell launch a period-instrument orchestra in Cleveland. Sorrell was 26.

With Wright's assistance, she received start-up funding from The Cleveland Foundation.  The ensemble made its debut in June 1992 under the name of Apollo's Fire - The Cleveland Baroque Orchestra. The debut concerts were sold out.  Apollo's Fire began receiving touring invitations within a few months.  Since then, Sorrell has led Apollo's Fire as Music Director and has developed a national and international reputation for creative programming.

Career

Apollo's Fire
Sorrell's focus with Apollo's Fire has been the 18th-century ideal of Affekt, in which the performers use rhetoric and dramatic inflection to move the emotional moods of the listeners.  She has been credited with "forging a vibrant and life-affirming approach to the re-making of early music". Eight of her CD recordings have become bestsellers on the Billboard classical chart in the U.S.  In addition, she has led Apollo's Fire on tour at Carnegie Hall, the BBC Proms, London's Wigmore Hall, the Royal Theare (Teatro Real) of Madrid, the Grand Opera House of Bordeaux, the Boston Early Music Festival and the Aspen Music Festival and extensive North American tours of the Brandenburg Concertos and the Monteverdi Vespers.  In Cleveland, Sorrell's concerts with Apollo's Fire are admired for consistently drawing one of the largest audiences in the country for period-instrument music. In 1999 Sorrell established a folk wing of Apollo's Fire, consisting of hand-picked artists who are steeped in traditional British Isles and early American folk music as well as historical performance.

In 2010, her 1999 CD recording of Bach's Brandenburg Concertos and 2 harpsichord concertos was released into the European market for the first time, when Apollo's Fire signed on with the British record label Avie. The recording received considerable attention in the press. The Sunday Times (London) called it "a swaggering version… The most is made of the instrumental colours Bach so exhilaratingly put on show. The keyboard part in the 5th Brandenburg is brilliantly played by Sorrell." Early Music America called it "stunning... A fabulous harpsichord cadenza played with gusto by Sorrell... perfectly polished."  Audiophile Audition wrote, "Nothing short of spectacular in every way... Jeannette Sorrell is something of a wunderkind."  The American Record Guide wrote, "Sorrell leads from the harpsichord and delivers a brilliant take-no-captives rendition of the big solo in No. 5.  In all, these performances are lively and unfailingly attractive — the best in what historical performance can be."

Shortly thereafter, AVIE released Sorrell's recording of the Monteverdi Vespers.  This too received international attention, and become a Top 10 best-seller on the Billboard classical chart (USA) in October 2010. The Sunday Times called it "Exultant... instrumental colours blaze brilliantly." Fanfare hailed the disc as "a stunning achievement....  Wins out handily over William Christie's versions and other recent issues."  The International Record Review wrote that "Sorrell and her fine young choir lavish attention on every phrase and inflexion.  The exhilaration and sense of discovery is utterly infectious... an unanticipated delight."  And Cleveland's The Plain Dealer called it "a resplendent account, brilliantly motivated by Sorrell and performed with vibrant attention to dramatic detail.  In short, a thriller from first note to last."

In 2011, Sorrell's early American disc Come to the River was released by AVIE and debuted in the Billboard Top 10 (USA) during June and July.  The program, consisting of Appalachian folk music mostly arranged by Sorrell, was the result of two years of work by Sorrell and was supported by a prestigious grant from the "American Masterpieces" initiative of the National Endowment for the Arts.  Fanfare hailed it as "wonderfully exuberant…simply delightful.  Here we have music that offers life, and does so abundantly."  The American Record Guide called it, "a vibrant American sampler… one of the most joyous releases, intoxicated by the sheer joy of being alive."

Later that year, AVIE also released Sorrell's disc of Vivaldi concertos, La Folia (Madness). The Independent wrote, "Under the inspired direction of Sorrell, Apollo's Fire has become one of the pre-eminent period-instrument ensembles, causing one to hear familiar baroque material anew."  The American Record Guide called it "an outstanding collection, performed by a terrific early instrument orchestra" while the Cleveland Plain Dealer described it as "vivid, earthy and ardent… Be prepared to sit straight up.  Baroque chestnuts sound utterly new in the crisp, vital performances that Sorrell shapes."

In 2012, AVIE released a new disc by Apollo's Fire called Sacrum Mysterium - A Celtic Christmas Vespers.  This was a collaboration between Sorrell and French Canadian lutenist Sylvain Bergeron.  The program interweaves excerpts from the 13th-century Vespers of St. Kentigern (patron saint of Glasgow, Scotland) with pagan carols and Celtic dances and fiddle tunes.  The disc debuted at #11 on the Billboard classical chart in December of that year.  The CD was praised by the International Record Review(UK) for its "mixture of passion and reverence".  In the U.S., Listen Magazine described it as "lovingly prepared… the Christmas myth is brought to vivid life." American Record Guide called it "magical… an exquisite program, adroitly mixing joy, solemnity and the sacred."  Early Music America called it "beautifully executed.  The dances are ecstatic, the solo voices are engaging, and the vocal ensemble is wonderfully blended.  The vitality and energy are palpable, and the musicianship is superb."

Guest conducting and awards
Jeannette Sorrell is the only baroque conductor to have been taken onto the roster of Columbia Artists Management (CAMI). She made her debut with the Pittsburgh Symphony in 2013 as conductor and soloist in the complete Brandenburg Concertos.  With standing ovations every night, the event was hailed by the Pittsburgh Tribune as "an especially joyous occasion". She has also appeared as conductor or conductor/soloist with the St Paul Chamber Orchestra, the Utah Symphony, the New World Symphony in Miami, the Los Angeles Chamber Orchestra, Seattle Symphony, the Opera Theatre of St. Louis with the St. Louis Symphony, Handel and Haydn Society (Boston), the Florida Orchestra, North Carolina Symphony, Grand Teton Music Festival, San Diego Symphony, the Omaha Symphony, Grand Rapids Symphony, Arizona Opera, and has appeared with the Cleveland Orchestra as guest keyboard artist.  In February 2014 she replaced British conductor/harpsichordist Richard Egarr on five days' notice, leading the complete Brandenburg Concertos as conductor/soloist for the Houston Early Music Festival in its inaugural year. She has also led many baroque projects for Oberlin Conservatory and the Cleveland Institute of Music.

In 2017 she made her Kennedy Center debut leading the National Symphony Orchestra in Handel's Messiah.

Civic activist
Sorrell is a frequent speaker to civic groups, student groups, and women's groups, on topics such as entrepreneurial leadership, women as leaders, and building new audiences for the arts. In 2016 she was invited to address the League of Women Voters in Oberlin, Ohio, on Women's Equality Day. She has also been active as a political volunteer.

External links
Apollo's Fire

References

Aspen Music Festival and School alumni
Living people
1965 births
Women conductors (music)
Founders of early music ensembles
American harpsichordists
Musicians from San Francisco
American people of Swiss descent
Oberlin Conservatory of Music alumni
20th-century American conductors (music)
20th-century American women musicians
21st-century American conductors (music)
21st-century American women musicians
Classical musicians from California
Classical musicians from Virginia